The 2008 National Club Baseball Association (NCBA) Division I World Series was played at City of Palms Park in Fort Myers, FL from May 23 to May 29. The eighth tournament's champion was Colorado State University. This was Colorado State's fourth title in the last five years. The Most Valuable Player was Brian Dilley of Colorado State University.

Colorado State became the first team in NCBA World Series history to lose their first game and win the World Series.

Format
The format is similar to the NCAA College World Series in that eight teams participate in two four-team double elimination brackets with the only difference being that in the NCBA, there is only one game that decides the national championship rather than a best-of-3 like the NCAA.

Participants

Results

Bracket

Game Results

See also
2008 NCBA Division II World Series

References

Baseball competitions in Fort Myers, Florida
2008 in baseball
National Club Baseball Association
2008 in sports in Florida